Vashnam-e Heydar Saleh Zahi (also Romanized as Vashnām-e Ḩeydar Şāleḩ Zahī; also known as Vashnām, Vashnām-e Bālā, and Vashnām-e Ḩeydar) is a village in Kambel-e Soleyman Rural District, in the Central District of Chabahar County, Sistan and Baluchestan Province, Iran. At the 2006 census, its population was 45, in 8 families.

References 

Populated places in Chabahar County